James Eric Lloyd (born 17 July 1954) is an Australian former politician who served with the Liberal Party of Australia member of the Australian House of Representatives from the March 1996 election until the November 2007 election, representing the Division of Robertson in New South Wales.

Biography
Lloyd was born in Sydney and educated at Homebush Boys High School and worked in a variety of occupations, including milkman, ferry and cruise boat crew member, manager of a marina and service station proprietor before entering politics.

Lloyd was the Liberal Party candidate for the safe Labor seat of Peats at the 1984 New South Wales state election, gathering 33.40% of the vote. His lobbying work prior to entering politics included collecting 60,000 signatures which resulted in the re-opening of the Cheero Point section of the Pacific Highway, which had been closed for several years following landslides.

Lloyd was Chief Government Whip from 2001 to 2004 before his appointment as Minister for Local Government, Territories and Roads in July 2004. He was defeated in the 2007 election by Labor member Belinda Neal.

References

1954 births
Living people
Liberal Party of Australia members of the Parliament of Australia
Members of the Australian House of Representatives for Robertson
Members of the Australian House of Representatives
21st-century Australian politicians
20th-century Australian politicians
Government ministers of Australia